Marcelle Dormoy (1895–1976) was a French couture fashion designer active from the 1910s to 1950, and a former model.

Dormoy was born Marie-Léonie Graftieaux, but changed her name to Marcelle Dormoy in 1916 soon after the birth of her son Pierre-Edouard. Graftieaux started out as a mannequin for Paul Poiret, which she credited with helping her learn to "understand the female body." At this time, her grandson has claimed, Graftieaux met Edward, Prince of Wales, probably at Luna Park, Paris and he may have fathered her son. Pierre-Edouard's birth was registered over a year after the event, and the certificate does not identify his father, but in addition to her name change, Dormoy reportedly came into a sum of money that enabled her to set up a dressmaking business. Later, in the mid-1940s when Dormoy's grandson François was born, his mother received an unexplained gift of a Van Cleef & Arpels "cadenas" diamond watch-bracelet made after a design originally commissioned by Edward (now the Duke of Windsor) for his wife Wallis Simpson - a gift that Pierre-Edouard Graftieaux could not have afforded to give his wife.

During the 1920s, Dormoy worked with Vionnet alongside other designers such as Jacques Griffe and Marcelle Chaumont. As première d'atelier, she was head of the workroom at Vionnet until she left to launch her own couture house in December 1928. This date was open to question even while Dormoy was in business, with M.D.C. Crawford stating in 1941 that Dormoy launched "his" (sic) business in 1934, and the mannequin "Freddy" recalling a launch date of 1927 in her 1958 memoirs.

In 1937 Dormoy had her portrait painted by the artist Marie Laurencin, who accepted a fur coat as payment. This portrait was sold by the Swiss auction house Dobiaschofsky in 2013.

Dormoy remained with Jean Patou in Biarritz prior to returning to Paris, following the German occupation of France during World War II. She continued working during the Occupation, providing clothes to clients such as the actress Edwige Feuillère. In February 1946, Collier's published an article about Feuillère and Dormoy, noting that Dormoy's designs were among the first post-war models "by leading designers" to be bought by American buyers for export back home, despite a poor exchange rate meaning that each design cost $500–600. A picture caption in the article noted that Dormoy's unfussy designs typically featured free-flowing lines.

Dormoy closed her house in 1950, and died in 1976. Her son and daughter-in-law presented a 1948 evening gown that she had designed to the Musée Galliera.

References

Further reading

French fashion designers
1895 births
1976 deaths
1930s fashion
1940s fashion
French female models
French women fashion designers
20th-century French women